Sniatyn Raion was a raion (district) of Ivano-Frankivsk Oblast (province) of Ukraine. The city of Sniatyn was the administrative center of the raion. The raion was abolished on 18 July 2020 as part of the administrative reform of Ukraine, which reduced the number of raions of Ivano-Frankivsk Oblast Oblast to six. The area of Sniatyn Raion was merged into Kolomyia Raion.

Subdivisions
At the time of disestablishment, the raion consisted of two hromadas:
 Sniatyn urban hromada with the administration in Sniatyn;
 Zabolotiv settlement hromada with the administration in the urban-type settlement of Zabolotiv.

Notable residents
Bohdana Frolyak, composer
 Nicholas Hryhorczuk

References

Former raions of Ivano-Frankivsk Oblast
Pokuttia
1940 establishments in Ukraine
Ukrainian raions abolished during the 2020 administrative reform